Dimos Moutsis (born 2 August 1938) is a Greek singer-songwriter and composer.

Biography

Moutsis was born in Piraeus. He was a student of the violin at the Athens Conservatoire from the age of seven and graduated at the age of twenty one as a prize-winning soloist. During the late 1960s, he met poet and lyricist Nikos Gatsos and fellow composer Manos Hatzidakis at a cafeteria which was a well-known haunt for musicians and artists (Flokas).

In 1967, Gatsos began to provide Moutsis with poetry he had written, thus allowing Moutsis to write his first songs. The first song Moutsis wrote was 'Βρέχει ο Θεός' ('God is raining'), a piece he had already composed the music for and for which Gatsos provided lyrics. The singer Stamatis Kokotas was the first to record this song. Over the next few years, he continued to write songs with Gatsos which were recorded by well-known artists of the time such as Vicky Moscholiou and Grigoris Bithikotsis, as well as with newcomers such as Manolis Mitsias and Dimitra Galani. In 1970, Moutsis orchestrated and produced the music for album 'Επιστροφή', with songs by Hatzidakis and Gatsos. During the same period, Moutsis worked with other lyricists such as Lefteris Papadopoulos.

He was a candidate for MeRA25 in the 2019 European Parliament elections.

In 2021, he was accused of sexually assaulting singer Lydia Serbou when she was 15.

Discography

Music for theatre

Music for film

References

External links
 

Living people
Greek musicians
1938 births
20th-century pianists
Greek film score composers
Greek pianists
Greek songwriters
Male film score composers
Musicians from Piraeus
Male pianists
21st-century pianists
20th-century male musicians
21st-century male musicians